Peritoneal recesses (or peritoneal gutters) are the spaces formed by peritoneum draping over viscera.

The term refers mainly to four spaces in the abdominal cavity; the two paracolic gutters and the two paramesenteric gutters. There are other smaller recesses including those around the duodenojejunal flexure, cecum, and the sigmoid colon. These gutters are clinically important because they allow a passage for infectious fluids from different compartments of the abdomen. For example; fluid from an infected appendix can track up the right paracolic gutter to the hepatorenal recess.

The four peritoneal recesses are:
 The left and right paracolic gutters.
 The left and right paramesenteric gutters.

See also
 Hepatorenal recess

References

External links
  — "Abdominal Cavity: Peritoneal Gutters" page 1
  — "Abdominal Cavity: Peritoneal Gutters" page 2
  — "Abdominal Cavity: Peritoneal Gutters" page 3

Abdomen